Institute for Gulf Affairs (formerly the Saudi Institute) is a Washington, D.C.-based human rights advocacy group and think tank that monitors politics and education in the Middle East.  Ali al-Ahmed, a Saudi Arabian scholar and a critic of the Saudi monarchy, is the director and founder.

The institute provides information, analysis and research about the Persian Gulf region and matters of international relations and politics.

References

External links 

International human rights organizations
Think tanks based in Washington, D.C.